"Laughing With" is a song from Regina Spektor's fifth studio album, Far. It was released as the album's lead single on Regina's MySpace on May 8, 2009, and was officially released as a digital download on May 18 in various parts of Europe and in the United States and Canada on May 19.

Spektor arranged strings for this song, "but instead of a traditional quartet we had two cellos. I'm drawn to that, the lower sounds - bass, cello, tuba, that warm bottomy sound."

A physical EP was released in the U.S. on June 9, 2009. Apart from "Laughing With", it contains the songs Folding Chair, from Spektor's upcoming album; "The Call", which was featured in the soundtrack of the film The Chronicles of Narnia: Prince Caspian; and a live performance of "The Noise" from the Live at Bull Moose EP.

It was used in an episode of The Leftovers, season 2, episode 5: "No Room at the Inn".

Track listing

Music video
A music video directed by Adria Petty was released on May 26, 2009.

Charts
The song has reached #14 on the Billboard Hot Singles Sales. In Belgium the song has thus far peaked at #34 on the Singles Chart.

References

2009 singles
Regina Spektor songs
Folk ballads
Song recordings produced by Jacknife Lee
Songs written by Regina Spektor
2009 songs
Sire Records singles